Coleophora cecidophorella is a moth of the family Coleophoridae. It is found in France, Italy, Austria, Slovenia, Croatia, the Czech Republic, Slovakia, Hungary, Romania and Ukraine.

The larvae feed on Fallopia convolvulus and Fallopia dumetorum. They create a gall on the fruit of their host plant.

References

cecidophorella
Moths described in 1972
Moths of Europe